Fu is a small village in Dalarna, Sweden. The villlage is located close to Riksväg 70, about 10 kilometers south of Mora. About 50 people live in Fu and the neighboring village Fudal.

The stream Fuån flows trough the village.

References 

Villages in Sweden